Kadathur is a village in the Madathukulam Taluk of Tiruppur district in the Indian state of Tamil Nadu.

History
Kadathur was part of Coimbatore District until 2008, when a new district Tiruppur district was carved out.

Geography
It is situated on the banks of the river Amaravathi.

This village is surrounded by agriculture fields, coconut groves and Marutha (Arjuna) Trees.

Landmarks

Arjuneswarar Temple's presiding Deity is Arjuneswarar, which is a tall Lingam.

Transport 
This village is situated approximately 20 km from Udumalaipettai and connected by town buses.

References

External links 

Cities and towns in Tiruppur district